Tae-woo is a Korean male given name.

People with this name include:

 Jung Tae-woo (born 1982), South Korean actor 
 Kim Tae-Woo (wrestler) (born 1962), South Korean freestyle wrestler
 Kim Tae-woo (actor) (born 1971), South Korean actor
 Kim Tae-woo (singer) (born 1981), South Korean singer 
 Lee Tae-Woo (born 1984), South Korean football player 
 Roh Tae-woo (1932–2021), sixth president of South Korea (1988–1993)

See also
List of Korean given names

Korean masculine given names